Kazumichi (written: 和道) is a masculine Japanese given name. Notable people with the name include:

Kazumichi Takada, Japanese mixed martial artist
, Japanese footballer

Japanese masculine given names